Kersey is an unincorporated community and census-designated place in Fox Township, Elk County, Pennsylvania, United States. As of the 2010 census the population was 937.

History

The first permanent settlers of the county arrived in 1810 and founded Centreville at the headwaters of Little Toby Creek. Later that year, William Kersey built a gristmill and/or sawmill there, and the settlement was renamed "Kersey", though early sources sometimes refer to it as "Kersey's". At the time, the area was part of Clearfield County, as Elk County had not yet been formed. Early industries in the community were lumber and coal.

Geography
Kersey is located in northern Fox Township, in south-central Elk County.

The CDP includes the community of Dagus, to the west of Kersey proper. The community of Dagus Mines borders the CDP to the south.

Demographics

References

Census-designated places in Pennsylvania
Census-designated places in Elk County, Pennsylvania